Sergio Ulloa from the Ohio University, was awarded the status of Fellow in the American Physical Society, after they were nominated by their Forum on International Physics in 2007, for "his contributions to the theory of transport and optical properties of low-dimensional semiconductor systems and complex molecules, and his many contributions to international physics as organizer of schools, workshops, and conferences, in particular in Latin America."

References 

Fellows of the American Physical Society
American Physical Society
American physicists
Living people
Date of death missing
Year of birth missing (living people)